Gift of Love is the first English album of Norwegian singer Sissel Kyrkjebø. Neil Sedaka sang "Breaking Up Is Hard To Do" with her. According to Sedaka, when he first heard Sissel, he was speechless and had never been so excited with a female voice in the past thirty years. The first singer who brought him with that type of feeling was Barbra Streisand.

Track listing
Fire In Your Heart
The Gift of Love
If
 Breakaway
Need I Say More
Dream A Little Dream Of Me
Moonlight
Here, There and Everywhere
Miracle Song
Solitaire
Breaking Up Is Hard To Do
Calling You
More Like You

References

1993 albums
Sissel Kyrkjebø albums